Sword and Shield is an adventure module published in 1992 for the Dungeons & Dragons fantasy role-playing game.

Plot summary
Sword and Shield features a confrontation with the mysterious Black Knight.

Publication history
Sword and Shield was written by John Terra, and published by TSR, Inc.

Reception
Rick Swan reviewed Sword and Shield for Dragon magazine #191 (March 1993). He reviewed the adventure Quest for the Silver Sword in the same column, and felt that these two introductory adventures typify the "easy-on-the-brain" revised Dungeons & Dragons game, as each of them "boasts clutter-free story lines, maps that double as game boards, and colorful sheets of punch-out counters that makes playing a breeze". He felt that Sword and Shield "delivers the goods for players with a tad more experience" when compared with Quest for the Silver Sword, which was geared more towards beginners. Swan commented: "Game snobs may sneer at the meager plots and superficial characters - these are, after all, little more than glorified dungeon crawls - but the nasty monsters and gaudy treasures are guaranteed to dazzle novices. Weary Dungeon Masters can run either adventure almost effortlessly; I didn't even have to read them first."

References

Dungeons & Dragons modules
Mystara
Role-playing game supplements introduced in 1992